Mount Greenlee is a steep-sided, jagged mountain in Antarctica,  high; of metamorphic rock, it overlooks the west side of Shackleton Glacier just east of Mount Butters. It was named by F. Alton Wade, leader of the Texas Tech Shackleton Glacier Expedition (1962–63), for David W. Greenlee, a member of the party. It ranks as the 1,181st highest mountain in Antarctica.

References

Mountains of the Ross Dependency
Dufek Coast